"My Girl Bill" is a 1974 hit song written and recorded by Jim Stafford.  It was the third of four U.S. Top 40 singles from his eponymous debut album. The lyrics in the verses are spoken, rather than sung.

Premise
The song is about a man named William/Bill and his friend, the narrator of the song. The lyrics employ double entendre, leading the listener to infer that the men, as the title also suggests, are themselves involved in a romantic relationship. However, in the last verse a twist occurs; the narrator speaks of a woman who has been the men's mutual love interest but who has now summarily rejected Bill, and he is explaining the situation (i.e. "(she's) MY girl, Bill").

Chart performance
"My Girl Bill" reached number 12 on the U.S. Billboard Hot 100, number 7 on the Canadian pop singles chart and number 20 in the BBC UK Top 50 chart. It was a crossover hit onto the Adult Contemporary and Country charts of both nations.  The song was also a Top 20 hit in Australia.

Weekly charts

Year-end charts

Later uses

"My Girl Bill" was included on the 1975 Ronco compilation album, Far Out.

Actor Cash Backman covered the song in 1974.  His version reached number nine in Australia in 1974. and was the 77th biggest selling single of 1974, 14 places higher than Stafford's version.

References

External links
 Lyrics of this song
 

1974 singles
1974 songs
MGM Records singles
Jim Stafford songs
LGBT-related songs
Novelty songs